Psiloscirtus flavipes is a species of short-horned grasshopper in the family Acrididae. It is found in Colombia and Ecuador.

References

Acrididae
Orthoptera of South America
Insects described in 1898
Taxa named by Ermanno Giglio-Tos